St. Adalbert Parish - designated for Polish immigrants in Enfield, Connecticut, United States. Founded in 1915, it is one of the Polish-American Roman Catholic parishes in New England in the Archdiocese of Hartford. 

In 2017, St. Adalbert was merged with St. Patrick Parish in Enfield to form St. Raymond of Penafort parish. Both church buildings remain open for regularly scheduled worship within the consolidated parish.

History 
On September 1, 1907, Bishop of Hartford Michael Tierney made the priest Paul W. Piechocki responsible for the Polish immigrants. Bishop John Joseph Nilan established St. Adalbert Parish on January 17, 1915. Stanislaus Federkiewicz was named first pastor. 
The first Mass was offered in the unfinished church basement on Christmas 1915. Nilan dedicated the lower church on May 7, 1916. Finally, the completed St. Adalbert Parish was dedicated by Bishop Maurice F. McAuliffe on July 8, 1928.

Bibliography 
 John P. Gwozdz, A Place of Their Own. A History of Saint Adalbert Church, Enfield, Connecticut, 1915-1990, reviewed in Polish American Studies, Vol. 48, No. 2 (Autumn, 1991), pp. 87–89.
 
 The Official Catholic Directory in USA

External links 
 St. Adalbert - Diocesan information
 St. Raymond of Penafort Parish (St. Adalbert Church) - Catholicmasses.org
 Archdiocese of Hartford

Roman Catholic parishes of Archdiocese of Hartford
Polish-American Roman Catholic parishes in Connecticut
Enfield, Connecticut
Churches in Hartford County, Connecticut